Sachein is a 2005 Indian Tamil-language romantic comedy film directed by John Mahendran, and produced by Kalaipuli S. Thanu, starring Vijay and Genelia in lead roles, with  Vadivelu, Bipasha Basu  Santhanam and Raghuvaran appearing in pivotal roles. The film marks Bipasha Basu's first and only Tamil film. The score and soundtrack is composed by Devi Sri Prasad. Jeeva and V. T. Vijayan handled the cinematography and editing respectively. The film released on 14 April 2005 with positive reviews and was a commercial success. The film is a loose adaption of John Mahendran's Neetho.

Plot
Sachein, a carefree and happy going guy joins a college in Ooty and falls for Shalini immediately on seeing her in first sight. Shalini studies in the same college as Sachein and is considered a popular and beautiful student, while also being a short tempered and arrogant girl with an upper-middle class status. Sachein learns all of this information about her from Arnold aka Ayyasamy, a man who has studied in the college for about nine years and keeps studying there because he thinks that students should give their respect to their college professors, while also informing Sachein, that there are so many boys trying to impress her. This makes Sachein take a different route and he starts mocking Shalini in front of her, which irritates her. Slowly, they both become good friends, after Sachein saved her father in a bike accident. Santhanam, who is another student in the college also loves Shalini. But, he feels jealous seeing her and Sachein being good friends and decides to separate them. Santhanam writes in one of the walls of the college, that Sachein loves Shalini and this angers Shalini, as she misunderstands that Sachein has done it. Shalini shouts at Sachein, but Sachein informs Shalini, that he is so outspoken and does not want to write in the college wall to convey his love, which makes Shalini realize her mistake.

But to her surprise, Sachein informs that, although he has not written it, the content present on the wall is true which means that he is in love with Shalini. This again angers Shalini and she shouts at him that she considered him only as a good friend and that she wasn't in love with him. Later, Shalini overhears Sachein challenging Santhanam that Shalini will convey her love within the next thirty days, as their college years will be completed by then. Shalini challenges Sachein that she will never fall in love with him.

Manju (Bipasha Basu) is also from the same college and she likes Sachein. Shalini gets jealous when she spots Sachein and Manju together often. But Manju informs Shalini that Sachein loves Shalini so much and asks her not to hide her feelings, as it is very evident that Shalini too likes Sachein. This makes Shalini realize her love towards Sachein. Sachein learns that Shalini's parents have arranged a wedding for her and he meets Shalini on the last day of their college and says that he has lost the challenge and he will be leaving Ooty tomorrow. But Shalini hides her feelings towards Sachein and she plans to propose her love the next day as she wants to win the challenge by not conveying her love within the 30 days.

On the 31st day, Shalini is excited and goes to propose Sachein. But suddenly, she meets Gowtham on the way, who is Sachein's father. Gowtham is a billionaire, in which this fact makes the entire college be surprised that Sachein is the only son of a rich business tycoon, as Sachein always stays very simple and down to earth. Now Shalini feels bad, that if she proposes her love towards Sachein at this moment, then he might misunderstand that she decided to marry him after knowing that he is so rich and decides to stay calm. Sachein leaves to the Coimbatore International Airport in Coimbatore and Shalini also follows him. In the airport, Shalini could not control her emotions and proposes to Sachein. She also revealed that it is her ego that didn't let her convey her love during the last thirty days. Sachein feels so happy and the couple are united.

Cast

Production 
Shooting of this film commenced in Ooty.

Music

The soundtrack features six songs composed by Devi Sri Prasad, with lyrics written by Pa. Vijay, Kabilan, Na. Muthukumar, V. Elango, Palani Bharathi for the Tamil version and P. K. Mishra for the Hindi dubbed version. Vijay has sung a kuthu-number "Vaadi Vaadi" for this film. This was his last song as a playback singer, before rendering "Google Google" from Thuppakki (2012), after a seven-year sabbatical. The album was released on 7 March 2005. The songs "Vaadi Vaadi", "Dai Dai Dai Kattikkoda", "Kanmoodi Thirakumbothu" and "Gundu Manga Thoppukkulle" songs were became chartbusters upon its release.

Track list 

Sachien (Telugu)

Ghamandee (Hindi)

Release 
The film was released on 14 April 2005, coinciding with Tamil New Year, also clashing with the Rajinikanth-starrer Chandramukhi and Kamal Haasan-starrer Mumbai Xpress. The film was later dubbed into Hindi as Ghamandee for YouTube

Marketing 
ITC Limited involved in the film's promotion, which launched a special merchandise, featuring a few stills of Vijay from the film.

Reception
Behindwoods gave 5/5 praised Vijay as "It is a cakewalk for Vijay and his role has been etched out keeping his fans and common audience expectations in mind. His comedy track with Santhanam and Vadivelu, who are his collegemate, is quite run-of-mill" and "Vijay looks best in roles, which require him to portray tenderness. He wins the competition as the successful action socialromantic hero of this generation of actors". The Hindu stated `"Sachein' is a movie that fans as well as general audience would watch for Vijay alone" and said "Vijay alone makes the movie extremely watchable". Ananda Vikatan rated the film 42 out of 100. Visual Dasan of Kalki wrote "The team's captain (director) John has tried to deal with a very modest screenplay with love as the ground like everyone else. As the emotional chain between the main characters hangs loosely, his maiden attempt leaves the fans in awe."

References

External links 

2005 films
Films set in India
Films shot in Ooty
2005 romantic comedy-drama films
2000s Tamil-language films
Indian romantic comedy-drama films
Films scored by Devi Sri Prasad
Tamil remakes of Telugu films
Films directed by John Mahendran